Yeşiltaş is a village in the Yüksekova District of Hakkâri Province in Turkey. The village is populated by Kurds of the Oramar tribe and had a population of 560 in 2021.

The unpopulated hamlet of Darıca is attached to Yeşiltaş.

References 

Villages in Yüksekova District
Kurdish settlements in Hakkâri Province